Homalocephala bimaculata is a species of ulidiid or picture-winged fly in the genus Homalocephala of the family Tephritidae.

References

bimaculata
Insects described in 1839